Thrust-to-weight ratio is a dimensionless ratio of thrust to weight of a rocket, jet engine, propeller engine, or a vehicle propelled by such an engine that is an indicator of the performance of the engine or vehicle.

The instantaneous thrust-to-weight ratio of a vehicle varies continually during operation due to progressive consumption of fuel or propellant and in some cases a gravity gradient.  The thrust-to-weight ratio based on initial thrust and weight is often published and used as a figure of merit for quantitative comparison of a vehicle's initial performance.

Calculation
The thrust-to-weight ratio is calculated by dividing the thrust (in SI units – in newtons) by the weight (in newtons) of the engine or vehicle. Note that the thrust can also be measured in pound-force (lbf), provided the weight is measured in pounds (lb). Division using these two values still gives the numerically correct (dimensionless) thrust-to-weight ratio. For valid comparison of the initial thrust-to-weight ratio of two or more engines or vehicles, thrust must be measured under controlled conditions.

Electric vehicles

Aircraft
The thrust-to-weight ratio and wing loading are the two most important parameters in determining the performance of an aircraft.  For example, the thrust-to-weight ratio of a combat aircraft is a good indicator of the maneuverability of the aircraft.

The thrust-to-weight ratio varies continually during a flight.  Thrust varies with throttle setting, airspeed, altitude and air temperature.  Weight varies with fuel burn and payload changes. For aircraft, the quoted thrust-to-weight ratio is often the maximum static thrust at sea level divided by the maximum takeoff weight. Aircraft with thrust-to-weight ratio greater than 1:1 can pitch straight up and maintain airspeed until performance decreases at higher altitude.

In cruising flight, the thrust-to-weight ratio of an aircraft is the inverse of the lift-to-drag ratio because thrust is the opposite of drag, and weight is the opposite of lift. A plane can take off even if the thrust is less than its weight: if the lift to drag ratio is greater than 1, the thrust to weight ratio can be less than 1, i.e. less thrust is needed to lift the plane off the ground than the weight of the plane.

Propeller-driven aircraft
For propeller-driven aircraft, the thrust-to-weight ratio can be calculated as follows:

where  is propulsive efficiency (typically 0.8),  is the engine's shaft horsepower, and is true airspeed in feet per second.

Rockets

The thrust-to-weight ratio of a rocket, or rocket-propelled vehicle, is an indicator of its acceleration expressed in multiples of gravitational acceleration g.

Rockets and rocket-propelled vehicles operate in a wide range of gravitational environments, including the weightless environment. The thrust-to-weight ratio is usually calculated from initial gross weight at sea level on earth and is sometimes called Thrust-to-Earth-weight ratio. The thrust-to-Earth-weight ratio of a rocket or rocket-propelled vehicle is an indicator of its acceleration expressed in multiples of earth's gravitational acceleration, g0.

The thrust-to-weight ratio of a rocket improves as the propellant is burned. With constant thrust, the maximum ratio (maximum acceleration of the vehicle) is achieved just before the propellant is fully consumed. Each rocket has a characteristic thrust-to-weight curve, or acceleration curve, not just a scalar quantity.

The thrust-to-weight ratio of an engine is greater than that of the complete launch vehicle, but is nonetheless useful because it determines the maximum acceleration that any vehicle using that engine could theoretically achieve with minimum propellant and structure attached.

For a takeoff from the surface of the earth using thrust and no aerodynamic lift, the thrust-to-weight ratio for the whole vehicle must be greater than one. In general, the thrust-to-weight ratio is numerically equal to the g-force that the vehicle can generate. Take-off can occur when the vehicle's g-force exceeds local gravity (expressed as a multiple of g0).

The thrust-to-weight ratio of rockets typically greatly exceeds that of airbreathing jet engines because the comparatively far greater density of rocket fuel eliminates the need for much engineering materials to pressurize it.

Many factors affect thrust-to-weight ratio. The instantaneous value typically varies over the duration of flight with the variations in thrust due to speed and altitude, together with changes in weight due to the amount of remaining propellant, and payload mass. Factors with the greatest effect include freestream air temperature, pressure, density, and composition. Depending on the engine or vehicle under consideration, the actual performance will often be affected by buoyancy and local gravitational field strength.

Examples

Aircraft

Jet and rocket engines

Fighter aircraft 

 Table for Jet and rocket engines: jet thrust is at sea level
 Fuel density used in calculations: 0.803 kg/l
 For the metric table, the T/W ratio is calculated by dividing the thrust by the product of the full fuel aircraft weight and the acceleration of gravity.
 J-10's engine rating is of AL-31FN.

See also
 Power-to-weight ratio
 Factor of safety

Notes

References
 John P. Fielding. Introduction to Aircraft Design, Cambridge University Press, 
 Daniel P. Raymer (1989). Aircraft Design: A Conceptual Approach, American Institute of Aeronautics and Astronautics, Inc., Washington, DC. 
 George P. Sutton & Oscar Biblarz. Rocket Propulsion Elements, Wiley,

External links
 NASA webpage with overview and explanatory diagram of aircraft thrust to weight ratio

Jet engines
Rocket engines
Engineering ratios